Pencak Silat at the 2013 Southeast Asian Games was held at Zayyarthiri Sports Complex, Naypyidaw, Myanmar between December 8–15.

Medalists

Artistic

Tarung

Men

Women

Medal table

References

2013 Southeast Asian Games events
2013